The Florei is a right tributary of the river Doftana in Romania. The upper reach of the river is also known as Șteiasa. It flows into the Doftana in Teșila.

References

Rivers of Romania
Rivers of Prahova County